Stella is an unincorporated community in Calloway County, Kentucky, United States. It was originally called Goshen as that was the name of the community's Methodist church.  When a post office was established on February 2, 1895, it became known as Stella and was named for either the daughter of a Mr. Scarborough (who donated the land) or a Mr. Waterfield (a local store keeper).  The post office closed in 1904.  Some people still refer to the community as Goshen as the Methodist congregation still exists.

References

Unincorporated communities in Calloway County, Kentucky
Unincorporated communities in Kentucky